Central Hålogaland is a district of Northern Norway constituting the traditional districts of Ofoten, Lofoten, Vesterålen and Southern Troms og Finnmark. It has a population of 117,000, with the largest towns being Harstad (23,000) and Narvik (18,000). Smaller towns which act as regional centers include Svolvær, Sortland, and Leknes. The Norwegian Police Service has Central Hålogaland as a police district with head office in Harstad.

Transport
The main road through the district is European Road E10, which runs from the Norway–Sweden border via Narvik and Evenes through Lofoten, and E6, which runs north–south. Harstad/Narvik Airport, Evenes is the region's only primary airport, although there are five additional regional airports, Narvik, Svolvær, Stokmarknes, Leknes, Værøy and Røst. Narvik is connected to the Swedish railway network with the Ofoten Line. The district has 17 ports and 14 ferry services.

References

Districts of Nordland
Districts of Troms og Finnmark